Susan Brimer Loving (born March 23, 1950) was Oklahoma's first female attorney general. She was appointed in 1991 after serving as both first assistant attorney general and chief of legal services in the Office of the Attorney General.

Career
Loving attended the University of Oklahoma for her undergraduate and law degrees and was appointed to the office of Attorney General when Robert Henry left to become dean of the Oklahoma City University School of Law.

Post-Politics
Since leaving office, Loving served as managing partner of Lester, Loving and Davies law firm and was a member of the Oklahoma Pardon and Parole Board for eight years, as an appointee of Governor Brad Henry.

She has served on the board of multiple civic organizations, and is a member of the Professional Responsibility Tribunal of the Oklahoma Bar Association.

Loving is the author of "The Southwestern Bell Case: Policy, Politics or Lawmaking Gone Awry," Oklahoma City University Law Review, fall 1994.

See also
List of female state attorneys general in the United States

References

1950 births
Living people
Oklahoma Attorneys General
Oklahoma Democrats
Women in Oklahoma politics